The athletics competition at the 2010 Commonwealth Games was held in New Delhi, India between 6 and 14 October. The track and field events took place between 6–12 October at the Jawaharlal Nehru Stadium while the marathon contests were held on a street course running through the city on 14 October.

A total of 46 athletics events were contested, which made it the sport with the second greatest number of medals on offer after the aquatics competition. The programme was almost identical to that of the 2006 edition, with the sole exception being the men's 50 km race walk, which was dropped. As in 2006, three men's and three women's disability athletics events were contested alongside the open competition.

Each of the Commonwealth Games Associations could send a maximum of three participants per event and a team of six for relay events. Kenya topped the medal table, with eleven gold medals and 29 medals in total. This was the first time that the nation achieved the feat, beating the typically dominant nations Australia (eleven golds, but 20 overall) and England (seven golds, 26 medals). Canada and Jamaica rounded out the top five while hosts India enjoyed their greatest ever haul at the Games, taking home two golds and twelve medals altogether.

Four failed doping tests have so far been announced: Nigerian Oludamola Osayomi was stripped of the women's 100 m title,  and her compatriot Samuel Okon, a 110 m hurdler, was also disqualified. Both athletes tested positive for methylhexanamine. Rani Yadav, India's representative in the women's 20 km walk, was the third athlete to fail a test as 19-Norandrosterone was detected in her sample. Osayomi's 100 m stripped gold initially went to Sally Pearson of Australia but a delay in the appeals process saw Pearson disqualified for a false start some time after the race. Folashade Abugan of Nigeria tested positive for Testosterone prohormone following the final of the women's 400 metres. She was disqualified from the 400 metres and the Nigerian team, of which she was a member, were disqualified from the women's 4 x 400 metres relay where they had originally placed second.

Preparation
A test event for the competition was scheduled in late July: the Asian All-Star Athletics Meet featured a number of prominent Asian athletes and demonstrated the stadium's readiness for games usage.

Many of the most prominent athletes from the Commonwealth were absent from the competition. Caster Semenya, Commonwealth champion Christine Ohuruogu, and Olympic medallist Lisa Dobriskey were among the athletes missing due to injury, but others including Usain Bolt, David Rudisha and Shelly-Ann Fraser opted to miss the competition out of choice – all ten of the year's fastest Commonwealth men's 100 m runners (including defending champion Asafa Powell) were not present. Further to this, two reigning world champions (English jumper Phillips Idowu and Australian thrower Dani Samuels) declared themselves out of the running on grounds of the security and accommodation conditions in Delhi. The competition's late scheduling within the track and field season was a primary factor in many athlete withdrawals.

In spite of this, a number of Olympic champions and other prominent names were selected to compete, including Australian Olympic/World champion Steve Hooker and New Zealand's Olympic/World Champion Valerie Adams, top Kenyan runners Nancy Langat, Vivian Cheruiyot and Ezekiel Kemboi, Bahamian high jumper Donald Thomas, and South Africa's Commonwealth champions L.J. van Zyl and Sunette Viljoen. Former world record holder Steve Cram emphasised the Games' role in developing younger athletes: "That's what it was for me, at 17 years old I went to the Commonwealth Games because Coe and Ovett didn't go. Nobody at the time was telling me it was bad that Coe and Ovett weren't there."

The stadium's track and field was damaged during the opening ceremony and major works – including the re-laying of the tarmac on the track and grass on the infield – took place in the 24 hours leading up to the first day of athletics events at the stadium. Three training venues were allocated for the athletics events: the Commonwealth Games Village 2010, Thyagaraj Sports Complex and the Delhi University sports complex.

Medal summary

Men

* Athletes who participated in the heats only and received medals.

Men's para-sport

Women

* Athletes who participated in the heats only and received medals.

Women's para-sport

Games statistics
At the competition Amantle Montsho (Botswana) and Cydonie Mothersill (Cayman Islands) all won the first ever Commonwealth gold medals for their respective countries. Natasha Mayers (St. Vincent and Grenadines), won the first gold medal ever by a female for her country. The number of medal sweeps in the athletics (6) was at an all-time high for the competition: Kenya took all top three spaces in four events, England beat all in the men's hurdles while hosts India completed a 1–2–3 in the women's discus.

Medal table

Participating nations 
61 Nations competed leaving 11 that did not.

References

Day reports
Rowbottom, Mike (2010-10-07). Kipsiro upsets Kipchoge - Commonwealth Games Day One. IAAF. Retrieved on 2010-10-10.
Rowbottom, Mike (2010-10-08). Clarke and Oludamola take 100m crowns, Armstrong dominates Shot Put in Delhi – Commonwealth Games Day Two. IAAF. Retrieved on 2010-10-10.
Rowbottom, Mike (2010-10-09). Langat breaks Games 1500m record, Turner leads high hurdles sweep for England in Delhi – Commonwealth Games Day Three. IAAF. Retrieved on 2010-10-10.
Rowbottom, Mike (2010-10-10). Two more gold for Kenya, Adams dominates Shot Put - Commonwealth Games Day Four. IAAF. Retrieved on 2010-10-10.
Rowbottom, Mike (2010-10-11). Kenyan men sweep 800m, two medals for India in Delhi - Commonwealth Games, Day Five. IAAF. Retrieved on 2010-10-14.
Rowbottom, Mike (2010-10-12). India sweeps women's Discus Throw, Langat and Kipsiro complete doubles – Commonwealth Games Day Six. IAAF. Retrieved on 2010-10-14.
Rowbottom, Mike (2010-10-13). Women's relay team crowns Indian glory - Commonwealth Games, Day Seven. IAAF. Retrieved on 2010-10-14.
Rowbottom, Mike (2010-10-14) Double marathon triumph for Kenya ends athletics programme at Commonwealth Games. IAAF. Retrieved on 2010-10-15.

External links
Competition schedule

 
2010
2010 Commonwealth Games events
Commonwealth Games
2010 Commonwealth Games
2010 Commonwealth Games